Ranunculus aconitifolius, the aconite-leaf buttercup or bachelor's buttons, is a species of flowering plant in the buttercup family Ranunculaceae, native to central Europe.

This species forms clumps, sometimes large colonies in moist places in mountains, meadows, edges of ditches and streams.

The Latin specific epithet aconitifolius means “with leaves resembling aconite”, a reference to the related genus Aconitum, the monkshoods.

The double-flowered cultivar R. aconitifolius 'Flore Pleno' (fair maids of France, fair maids of Kent) has gained the Royal Horticultural Society's Award of Garden Merit.

References

 Species Plantarum 1: 551. 1753. (1 May 1753)

External links
 

aconitifolius
Flora of Europe
Plants described in 1753
Taxa named by Carl Linnaeus